Luiz Carlos Vasconcelos (born 25 June 1954) is a Brazilian actor.

Selected filmography

Film

Television

References

External links
 

1954 births
Living people
Brazilian male film actors